Zemanek is a Czech surname. Notable people with the surname include:

 Bohumil Zemánek (1942–1996), Czech sculptor
 Heinz Zemanek (1920–2014), Austrian computer pioneer
 John Zemanek (1921–2016), American architect
 Stan Zemanek (1947–2007), Australian radio broadcaster

Czech-language surnames